Podocarpus urbanii is a species of conifer in the family Podocarpaceae. It is found only in Jamaica.

References

urbanii
Near threatened plants
Taxonomy articles created by Polbot
Endemic flora of Jamaica